Sir Michael John Austin Cummins (26 November 1939 – 25 January 2020) was a British parliamentary official. He was the Serjeant-at-Arms of the British House of Commons between 2000 and 2005. He was knighted in the 2003 Birthday Honours.

References

1939 births
2020 deaths
3rd Carabiniers officers
Graduates of the Royal Military Academy Sandhurst
Knights Bachelor
Royal Scots Dragoon Guards officers
Serjeants-at-Arms of the British House of Commons